Riot Sydney (formerly BigWorld Technology and Wargaming Sydney) is an Australian software company. It was the developer of BigWorld, a middleware development tool suite for creating massively multiplayer online games (MMO) and virtual worlds. It was formed in 2002 by John De Margheriti . It was the first company that developed such a middleware platform for the MMO market. In 2007, BigWorld was recognized by the UK's Develop magazine as an industry leader. 

On 7 August 2012, Wargaming — which had used BigWorld as part of the infrastructure for games such as World of Tanks — acquired BigWorld Technology for US$45 million. Wargaming stated that it would continue to license and support BigWorld, and foresaw the possibility that it could offer its own technologies with BigWorld for third-party licensors as well. The studio was subsequently operated as Wargaming Sydney. On 17 October 2022, Wargaming sold the studio to Riot Games for an undisclosed amount, renaming it Riot Sydney; the sale excluded the BigWorld technology itself and the studio's publishing arm, which will be retained by Wargaming.

Technical overview
BigWorld Technology provides an underlying software architecture that can be used by game developers to build MMO's and online games. The 3D client technology is built for Windows PCs and browsers, and is available on iOS, Xbox 360 and PlayStation 3 via a network API. The back-end server solution is implemented on Linux, with a Python API scripting environment. The tool suite includes content creation tools, server monitoring tools and support. BigWorld Technology also integrates various third party plugins such as Umbra (occlusion culling), Scaleform (user interface creation), Speedtree (foliage), and Vivox (VOIP).

Games
Published games using BigWorld Technology include World of Tanks (Wargaming), World of Warplanes (Wargaming), World of Warships (Wargaming), Realm of the Titans (Aeria Games), VIE: Virtual Island of Entertainment (enVie Interactive LLC), Hokuto no ken ONLINE (GungHo Online Entertainment), (Meteor Games), Moego (Userjoy), Tian Xia III (Netease) and Secret Kingdoms Online (Globex Studios).

List of games made with BigWorld technology
 Stalker Online Stay Out – MMO [OBT]
 Versalis – switched to Unity & SmartFoxServer [under development]
 Negaia (Vankenthor Entertainment) – switched to Unity & SmartFoxServer [under development]
 Origins of Malu (Burning Dog Media) – switched to Unreal Engine [under development]
 World of Tanks Blitz (Wargaming)
 World of Tanks (Wargaming) – switched to Core Engine
 World of Warplanes (Wargaming)
 World of Warships (Wargaming)
 Realm of the Titans (Aeria Games)
 Moego (Userjoy)
 Kingdom Heroes 2 Online (Userjoy)
 VIE: Virtual Island of Entertainment (enVie Interactive LLC)
 Heroes: Scions of Phoenix (Userjoy)
 Tian Xia II (NetEase)
 Tian Xia III (NetEase)
 Grandia Online (Gung Ho Online)
 Secret Kingdoms Online (Globex Studios)
 States at War (Sunhome Entertainment)
 Kai Xun (Zhejiang Kai Xun Technology Co., Ltd.)
 Twinity (Metaversum GmbH)
 Genesis: Journey to the West (Netease)
 Legendary Champions (Aeria Games)
 Hokuto no ken ONLINE (Gung Ho Interactive)
 Floral Fire Online (TianCheng Interactive)
 House of Flying Daggers (T2CN)
 Interzone Futebol
 Kwari (Kwari Ltd)
 Storm Hawks MMO (Bitcasters, Inc.)
 SZone Online

Server load balancing
BigWorld Server supports dynamic load balancing, a feature that automatically and dynamically spreads user load across multiple cell apps on the same game server, allowing for large numbers of concurrent users to inhabit the same game space. In 1999, BigWorld ran a test simulating 900 entities on the same server. In 2005, large scale tests were carried out at the IBM Deep Computing facility in Poughkeepsie, NY. BigWorld successfully demonstrated the linear scalability of its load balancing technology by dynamically balancing 100,000 entities across various cell apps on a single server.

Licenses
BigWorld Technology is offered in the following licenses:

 BigWorld Technology: Commercial Edition
 BigWorld Technology: Indie Edition (Development, Support) Sales were stopped after the company was acquired.

Guinness World Record
World of Tanks is built on BigWorld Technology. On 23 January 2011, Guinness stated that the World of Tanks Russian server broke the previous record for Most Players Online Simultaneously on One MMO Server when they reached 91,311 concurrent users. In November 2011 World of Tanks reached a new concurrency level of 250,000 players.

Awards
BigWorld Technology has received a number of business and technology innovation related awards:
 Winner 2008 Deloitte Technology Fast 500 Asia Pacific Awards (ranked 93)
 Winner 2008 Deloitte Technology Fast 50 Australia Award (ranked 7–526% growth)
 Deloitte Technology Fast 500
 Asia Pacific 2008 Winner – (Ranked 93)
 Deloitte Technology Fast 50 Australia 2008 Program – (7th Fastest growing technology company in Australia)
 2007 Australian Export Awards – Austrade Arts, Entertainment & Design Award Finalist
 2007 Finalist of Australian Technology Showcase Patrons Awards
 2006 Cool Company Awards
 2006 Finalist of the Secrets of Australian IT Innovation competition, Arts and Entertainment category
 2005 Winner ACT Chief Minister's Export Award in Art and Entertainment Award
 Red Herring 100 Private Companies of Asia (2005)
 2005 Australian Game Developer Awards – Award for Outstanding Innovation
 2005 Sumea Awards for Best Engine Technology
 Secrets of Australian IT Innovation 2005 Winner – 2nd Prize in Entertainment Category
 2003 Winner ACT Chief Ministers Export Award in the Arts and Entertainment
 2003 Winner of the Secrets of Australian IT Innovation competition in the Arts and entertainment category
 2003 Australian Game Developers Awards – Award for Outstanding Innovation
 2003 National Finalist of the Austrade Australian Export Award – Arts and Entertainment
 2003 Territory Winner in the Panasonic Australia Business Award Category of the Telstra and ACT Government Small Business Awards
 2003 National Winner in the Panasonic Australia Business Award Category of the Telstra and Australian Government Small Business Awards
 2002 National Finalist of the Austrade Australian Export Award – Arts and Entertainment
 2002 Winner ACT Chief Ministers Export Award in the Arts and Entertainment
 2002 Australian Winner of The Asia Pacific ICT Award (APICTA), Creative Digital Industries category

References

External links
 

Companies based in Sydney
Video game companies established in 1999
Video game companies of Australia
Video game development companies
1999 establishments in Australia